Z-plane may refer to:
 z = esT, the domain of the z-transform
 z = x + iy, the complex plane in general